Hermina Johanna van der Hoeven-Jansen (better known as Mirna van der Hoeven, born 8 May 1948) is a retired sprinter from the Netherlands. At the 1968 Summer Olympics, she finished second in the 400 m in the semifinal, setting her career record at 52.69 seconds. However, she slowed down to 53.0 s in the final and finished last. The same year she won the Amateur Athletic Association of England Championships in the same event.

References

1948 births
Living people
Athletes (track and field) at the 1968 Summer Olympics
Dutch female sprinters
Olympic athletes of the Netherlands
Sportspeople from The Hague
20th-century Dutch women
21st-century Dutch women